Nikhil Patil (born 27 November 1989) is an Indian first-class cricketer who plays for Mumbai.

References

External links
 

1989 births
Living people
Indian cricketers
Mumbai cricketers
Cricketers from Mumbai